Caroline Wozniacki was the defending champion, but lost to Naomi Osaka in the semifinals.

Osaka went on to win the title, defeating World No. 1 Ashleigh Barty in the final 3–6, 6–3, 6–2. This was Osaka's second Premier Mandatory title.

Barty and Karolína Plíšková were in contention for the WTA no. 1 singles ranking at the start of the tournament. Barty retained the top ranking when Plíšková lost in the first round to Jeļena Ostapenko.

Seeds

The four Wuhan semifinalists received a bye into the second round. They are as follows:
  Ashleigh Barty
  Petra Kvitová
  Alison Riske
  Aryna Sabalenka

Draw

Finals

Top half

Section 1

Section 2

Bottom half

Section 3

Section 4

Qualifying

Seeds

Qualifiers

Draw

First qualifier

Second qualifier

Third qualifier

Fourth qualifier

Fifth qualifier

Sixth qualifier

Seventh qualifier

Eighth qualifier

References

External links
 Main Draw
 Qualifying Draw

China Open - Women's Singles
Singles women